Sister Inez Andrews, born Inez McConico (April 14, 1929 – December 19, 2012) and better known as Inez Andrews, was an American gospel singer. Her soaring, wide-ranging voice — from contralto croon to soul-wrenching wail — made her a pillar of gospel music. The Chicago Tribune stated that "Andrews' throaty contralto made her low notes thunder, while the enormous range of her instrument enabled her to reach stratospheric pitches without falsetto" and that "her dramatic delivery made her a charismatic presence in church and on stage."

Andrews started singing in the church as a child and performed gospel music on the road in various gospel groups from the 1940s before joining The Caravans in 1957.  Fellow member from The Caravans in the 1950s, Shirley Caesar, once dubbed Andrews "The High Priestess" for her ability to hit high notes, and, in 2013, stated, "there never was and never will be another voice like Inez Andrews." Another early member of the Caravans, Albertina Walker often said, "nothing ever worked for the Caravans until Inez started whistling" — hitting the high notes.  She sang lead on The Caravans first breakthrough hit, "Mary Don't You Weep", and also had hits as a solo artist with crossover recordings such as "Lord Don't Move The Mountain". (#48 in 1973 on Billboard R&B chart on Song Bird label).  She was referred to in 2012 by the New York Times as "the last great female vocalist of gospel's golden age," ranking among the likes of other music legends from the "Golden Era" of Black Gospel (1945–60) – Mahalia Jackson, Marion Williams, Dorothy Love Coates, Sister Rosetta Tharpe and Clara Ward.

Biography 
Inez McConico was born in Birmingham, Alabama, to Theodore and Pauline McConico. Her mother died when she was two years old. Her father, a coal miner, was often out of work during the Great Depression. Andrews traveled a tough road to gospel stardom.  She began singing as a child in church and began songwriting as a young mother in Birmingham.  Andrews was working six days a week, ten hours a day for 18 dollars a week, while "washing, ironing, cooking, keep up with the kids."  With her busy life in her youth, she felt that life had to have more to offer her.  As she pondered that prayerfully, she picked up "a pencil and a brown paper bag" and began to write.  Thus began her songwriting career.  Andrews began her singing career in the 1940s with two groups in Birmingham, Alabama: Carter's Choral Ensemble and the Original Gospel Harmonettes. By the mid-1950s, the Harmonettes were one of the nation's top gospel groups, with Andrews the understudy for the group's lead singer, Dorothy Love Coates. Coates recommended Andrews to the Caravans, and she eventually moved north to Chicago to become widely known as that group's first successful singer, leading them to the high of their popularity in the 1950s and early 1960s.

In 1962, Andrews left the Caravans to start her own group, Inez Andrews and the Andrewettes. They toured the country performing songs such as "It's in My Heart" and her composition "(Lord I Wonder) What Will Tomorrow Bring?". By 1967 she was touring as a soloist.

In the 1960s, Andrews' solo work and songwriting further ensconced her in the gospel pantheon. Her songs were recorded by many artists, including The Mighty Clouds of Joy and Aretha Franklin. Andrews became one of the major stars of gospel's golden age, with The Caravans songs such as "Lord Keep Me Day By Day", "Remember Me", "I Won't Be Back" and several other hits in which Andrews was lead vocalist, including "Mary Don't You Weep", "I'm Not Tired Yet", "Make It In", "He Won't Deny Me" and "I'm Willing".

In 2006, she released a reunion album with The Caravans, Albertina Walker, Dorothy Norwood, and original soprano Delores Washington, entitled Paved the Way.

Solo career 
After a stellar career with the Caravans, she left the group in 1962 and had huge success with her 1972 crossover hit, "Lord Don't Move the Mountain".  Andrews recorded on many labels since the 1950s and has many albums and hit songs to her credit, some of which she composed herself. Andrews enjoyed further solo success throughout the 1970s and 1980s with songs such as "Just For Me", "A Sinner's Prayer" and a live 1981 recording of James Cleveland's hit song "I Appreciate". Andrews claimed to have written the gospel standard "No Tears In Heaven" early in her singing career. The writing credits for the song was disputed between her and Sallie Martin whom Andrews claimed wrote down the lyrics to the song while she was singing it at a program. Andrews recorded her version of the song in 1983.

Personal life 
Andrews was a dedicated Christian and family person. She raised seven children during her career in gospel music. She died at her home on the South Side of Chicago on December 19, 2012, at the age of 83. She had been diagnosed with cancer months earlier. Andrews is survived by seven children, 19 grandchildren and 12 great-grandchildren. She is the paternal great-grandmother of New Orleans native and female impersonator LeJeune Beautreaux, known professionally as Miss Tina Kennedy.

Honors and awards 
In 2002 Andrews was inducted into the Gospel Hall of Fame. She was a two-time Grammy Award nominee. It was announced prior to her death that Andrews would be honoured with the Ambassador Dr. Bobby Jones Legend Award at the 2013 Stellar Awards.  The award ended up being presented posthumously.

Discography 

 1963 – The Need of Prayer
 1964 – Letter to Jesus
 1972 – Lord Don't Move That Mountain
 1975 – This is Not the First Time I've Been Last
 1979 – Chapter 5
 1980 – A Sinner's Prayer
 1981 – I Made a Step
 1982 – My Testimony
 1984 – Lord Lift Us Up
 1986 – Jehovah is His Name
 1987 – The Two Sides of Inez Andrews
 1988 – If Jesus Came to Your Town Today
 198? - Close to Thee
 1990 – Lord Lift Us Up
 1990 – My Testimony
 1990 – I Made a Step in the Right Direction
 1990 – Inez Andrews
 1991 – Raise Up a Nation
 1991 – Shine on Me

Live album 
 1974 – Live At The Munich Gospel Festival
 1980 The Remarkable Inez Andrews with the True Voices of Christ Concert Ensemble Directed by Kevin Yancy " A Sinners Prayer"

Compilation albums 
 1999 – Headline News
 2005 – Most Requested Songs

Singles 
 1972 – "I'm Free" / "Lord Don't Move The Mountain"
 1975 – "Help Me" / "God's Humble Servant"
 1980 – "I'm Free" / "Lord Don't Move The Mountain" (re-release)
 19?? - "Close To Thee"

References

External links 

Inez Andrew's last interview

1929 births
2012 deaths
American gospel singers
African-American Christians
20th-century African-American women singers
Singers from Alabama
Musicians from Birmingham, Alabama
Savoy Records artists
21st-century American women